The following is a list of the top National Football League (NFL) quarterbacks in regular season wins. In the NFL, the starting quarterback is the only position that is credited with records of wins and losses. 

Tom Brady holds the record for the most regular season wins with 251. Brady also holds the record for the most postseason wins with 35.

Aaron Rodgers leads active players with 147 regular season wins and 11 postseason wins.

List

This sortable table shows the top 100 NFL quarterbacks in order of regular season wins, since the start of the modern era, 1950. The table also shows every team that a quarterback played for and his record with each team.

Notes
The NFL did not officially count ties in the standings until .  Therefore, ties occurring prior to 1972 do not count toward a quarterback's win percentage, while ties occurring in 1972 or later count as half-win, half-loss.
 Bobby Layne is listed as having started all 12 games for the Bulldogs (NFL) in 1949, and that team finished 1–10–1. Combined with his official post-1949 won–loss–tied record of 80–51–4 (.607), his overall estimated won–loss–tied record is 81–61–5 (.568).
The 1950 Baltimore Colts are a defunct NFL team and not affiliated with the current Indianapolis Colts.
Conerly is estimated to have gone 7–8–0 as a starter from 1948–1949. Combined with his official post-1949 record of 58–31–1, his overall estimated record is 65–39–1.
Graham also started 55 games for the Cleveland Browns when they were in the All-America Football Conference (1946–1949), and is estimated to have gone 48-4-3. Combined with his NFL record of 57–13–1, his overall estimated professional record (AAFC and NFL) is 105–17–4.

Postseason wins 
The following 40 quarterbacks have won at least five postseason games during their career:

See also 
NFL individual wins records
NFL starting quarterback playoff records
List of most consecutive starts by a National Football League quarterback

References 

Quarterback wins leaders
Wins
National Football League lists